Talentvision is a Canadian Mandarin Chinese specialty channel. It is owned by the Vancouver-based Fairchild Media Group (a subsidiary of the Fairchild Group) and TVB. Talentvision's studios are located inside Aberdeen Centre in the Golden Village district along with Fairchild TV and Fairchild Radio, in Richmond, British Columbia.
 
Talentvision features programming from China as well as Taiwan. It also has a Korean and Vietnamese block of programming. Originally it was a regional TV station only available in British Columbia but it is now available nationally across Canada.

Talentvision is the first Mandarin channel in Canada and it first went on the air in 1993 (together with Fairchild TV). It started out as a channel with mixed Cantonese and Mandarin content. Originally the broadcasting content was 60% Cantonese and 40% Mandarin. It started broadcasting entirely in Mandarin from June 1998 onwards. All of the Cantonese programs were transferred to Fairchild TV.

News

Talentvision TV produces two hours of local news on the weekdays and one hour of local news on the weekends. The newscasts airs at 7:30 pm and at 11:30 pm and are anchored out of their studios in Richmond.

Talentvision also airs foreign Mandarin newscasts from CCTV and TVBS.

Current anchors
 Susan Cheng (成松子)
 Todd Ye (葉一滔)

See also
 Fairchild TV (FTV)

External links
  

Analog cable television networks in Canada
Chinese-language mass media in Canada
Chinese-language television
Companies based in Richmond, British Columbia
Multicultural and ethnic television in Canada
Television channels and stations established in 1993